Spanish Mexicans are citizens or residents of Mexico who identify as Spanish as a result of nationality or recent ancestry. Spanish immigration to Mexico began in the early 1500s and spans to the present day. The vast majority of Mexicans have at least partial Spanish ancestry; the Northern regions of Mexico have a higher prevalence of Spanish heritage. There are three recognized large-scale Spanish immigration waves to the territory which is now Mexico: the first arrived during the colonial period, the second during the Porfiriato and the third after the Spanish Civil War.

The first Spanish settlement was established in February 1519 by Hernán Cortés in the Yucatan Peninsula, accompanied by about 11 ships, 500 men, 13 horses and a small number of cannons. In March 1519, Cortés formally claimed the land for the Spanish crown and by 1521 secured the Spanish conquest of the Aztec Empire.

Spanish colonization

The social composition of late sixteenth century Spanish immigration included both common people and aristocrats, all of which dispersed across New Spain. The enslavement of native populations and Africans, along with the discovery of new deposits of various minerals in the central and northern areas (from present day Sonora to the southern provinces of Mexico) created enormous wealth for Spain, especially in the extraction of silver. The exploitation of mining wealth from the indigenous populations through the mechanism of colonialism allowed the Spanish to develop manufacturing and agriculture that turned the Bajío regions and the valleys of Mexico and Puebla into prosperous agricultural areas with incipient industrial activity for the colonists, but indigenous populations were decimated by European diseases and mistreatment from the Spanish as a direct result of this.

In the 16th century, following the colonization of most of the new continents, perhaps 240,000 Spaniards entered ports in the Americas. They were joined by 450,000 in the next century. Since the conquest of the Aztec Empire, this region became the principal destination of Spanish colonial settlers in the 16th century. The first Spaniards who arrived in Mexico were soldiers and sailors from Extremadura, Andalucía and La Mancha after the conquest of the Americas. At the end of the 16th century both commoner and aristocrat from Spain were migrating to Mexico. Also, a few Canarian families colonized parts of Mexico in the 17th century (as in the case of the Azuaje families) and when the Spanish crown encouraged Canarian colonization of the Americas through the Tributo de sangre (Blood Tribute) in the 18th century, many of them settled in Yucatán, where by the 18th century they controlled the trade network that distributed goods throughout the peninsula; their descendants are still counted among the most influential families of direct Spanish descent in Mexico. During the 20th century, another group of Canarians settled in Mexico in the early 1930s, and as with Galician and other Spanish immigrants of the time, there were high rates of illiteracy and impoverishment among them, but they adapted relatively quickly.

History
After the independence of Mexico and centuries of brutal colonial rule, animosity emerged against Spanish people in the new nation. From August 1827 to 1834, by a decree issued during the government of Lorenzo de Zavala, many Spaniards and their families were expelled from the State of Mexico and killed. The state government, influenced by English masons or Yorkers, based on the Plan of Iguala and Treaty of Córdoba, liberated the state by stripping Spaniards of their haciendas, farms, ranches and properties.

On December 20, 1827, state deputies repealed the Spanish expulsion law, and many Criollo families returned to their farms and ranches protected by state congressional deputies. In the constitution of 1857, the ambiguities about Mexican citizens are removed, and Spaniards were recognized as foreign people.

In the period 1850–1950, 3.5 million Spanish left for the Americas, with Mexico becoming one of the chief destinations, especially its northern region where president Porfirio Diaz encouraged European immigration in order to supply labor. In 1910, there were 30,000 Spaniards in Mexico, with many participating in economic activities as agricultural labor and trade in urban areas. However, because they proportionally only made up .02% of the population in Mexico at the time, they could not influence the country's political life.

Most recent migrants came during the Spanish Civil War. More than 25,000 Spanish refugees settled in Mexico between 1939 and 1942, largely during the administration of President Lazaro Cardenas del Río. Some of the migrants returned to Spain after the Civil War, but many more remained in Mexico.

Due to the financial crisis of 2007–2008 and the resulting economic decline and high unemployment in Spain, many Spaniards emigrated to Mexico to seek new opportunities. For example, during the last quarter of 2012, 7,630 work permits were granted to Spaniards.

Economic and social issues

The Spanish community in Mexico includes business people, entertainers, academics, artists, and professional students. According to Milenio, Spanish companies are the largest foreign investors in Mexico.

Xenophobia 

Hispanophobia began during the Spanish Civil War because of the influx of Spanish immigrants in the country during Lázaro Cárdenas’ presidency, which caused a change in the Mexican education system. Through an effort of nation building, the government began identifying with the Aztec civilization rather than the Spaniards. Key figures of Mexican history such as Hernán Cortés were demonized and a generally negative perspective of the Spanish conquest became official history.

The word gachupín is used for Spaniards who live in Mexico and Guatemala as a slur, referring to conquistadors and people from Spain. Official history says Miguel Hidalgo y Costilla mentioned in the Grito de Dolores; Mueran los gachupines (Death to gachupines!).

Diego Rivera caused controversy with his mural Historia del estado de Morelos, conquista y revolución (The History of the State of Morelos, Conquest and Revolution), painted between 1929 and 1930. He was accused of Hispanophobia and his mural created a diplomatic conflict between the Mexican and Spanish governments. Upon being asked about criticisms of his mural, Rivera only replied “¡ya apareció el gachupín!” ("here's the gachupín").

Education 

Important Spanish schools remain in Mexico, such as Colegio Madrid of Mexico City, a scholarly institute founded in 1941 by Spanish immigrants and Mexican teachers. This is a private school for elementary education.

The Colegio de México (Colmex) was an organization of Spanish Civil War exiles beginning as "Casa de España en México" (House of Spain in Mexico). In 1939, Alfonso Reyes would be president of the "Colegio" until his death. Historian Daniel Cosío Villegas played an important role in its institutionalization and the Colegio's library bears his name.

Spanish culture in Mexico

Mexico is the largest and perhaps most culturally influential country in the Hispanosphere. Its culture is overwhelmingly derived from the Spanish founders and settlers of New Spain which would eventually become the modern day Republic of Mexico.

Languages 

Spanish was brought to Mexico around 500 years ago, although Nahuatl remained the official language for much of the colonial period. As a result of prolonged and mass immigration, many urban centers were predominantly populated by Spaniards by the early 19th century. Mexico City (Tenochtitlán) had also been the capital of the Aztec Empire, and many speakers of the Aztec language Nahuatl continued to live there and in the surrounding region, outnumbering Spanish-speakers for several generations. Consequently, Mexico City tended historically to exercise a standardizing effect over the entire country, more or less, evolving into a distinctive dialect of Spanish which incorporated a significant number of Hispanicized Nahuatl words.

Many Catalans fleeing Francoist Spain immigrated to Mexico, where they were free to express the Catalan language. The Orfeó Català de Mèxic was a mecca for Catalan speakers and artists.

Charreria 
Charrería, a word encompassing all aspects of the art of raising horses, evolved from the traditions that came to Mexico from Salamanca, Spain in the 16th century. When the Spanish first settled in Colonial Mexico, they were under orders to raise horses named criollos (Spanish people), but not to allow the indigenous people to ride. However, by 1528 the Spanish had very large cattle-raising estates and found it necessary to employ indigenous people as vaqueros or Creole herdsman, who soon became excellent horsemen. Smaller landholders, known as rancheros or ranchers, were the first genuine charros and they are credited as the inventors of the charreada.

Bullfighting 
Bullfighting arrived in Mexico with the first Spaniards. Records are found of the first bullfights debuted in Mexico on June 26, 1526, with a bullfight in Mexico City held in honor of explorer Hernán Cortés, who had just come back from Honduras (then known as Las Hibueras). From that point on, bullfights were staged all over Mexico as part of various civic, social and religious celebrations.
Today, there are about 220 permanent bullrings throughout Mexico with the largest venue of its kind is the Plaza de toros México in central Mexico City which opened in 1946 and seats 48,000 people.

Holy week 
Holy week is a Spanish tradition represented in many Mexican cities as San Luis Potosí City, Taxco de Alarcón or Morelia, this religious representation is very similar to Sevilla Holy week procession o Semana Mayor from other Spanish cities..

Spanish place names in Mexico 
Hundreds of places in Mexico are named after places in Spain or have Spanish names due to the Spanish colonialism, Spanish settlers and explorers.
These include:
Guadalajara, Jalisco, after Guadalajara, Spain,
Mérida, Yucatán after Mérida, Spain
Zamora, Michoacán after Zamora, Spain
León, Guanajuato after León, Spain
Valladolid, Yucatán after Valladolid, Spain and Morelia, Michoacán formerly named Valladolid de Michoacán
Nuevo León named after the former Kingdom of León in Spain
Monterrey city was named after the Countess of Monterrei (a city in Galicia, Spain), wife of the Viceroy of New Spain Gaspar de Zúñiga, 5th Count of Monterrey, Count of Monterrey, Spain.
Salamanca, Guanajuato named after Salamanca, Spain
Burgos, Tamaulipas named after Burgos, Spain
Linares, Nuevo León named after Linares, Spain
Jerez, Zacatecas named after Jerez de la Frontera, Spain
Durango, Durango named after Durango, Spain
Nuevo Laredo, Tamaulipas after Laredo, Cantabria, Spain
Córdoba, Veracruz after Córdoba, Spain
Zaragoza, Veracruz after Zaragoza, Spain
Zaragoza, Puebla after Zaragoza, Spain
Medellín, Veracruz after Medellín, Spain
Compostela, Nayarit after Santiago de Compostela
Villahermosa, Tabasco after Villahermosa del Campo, Spain
Reynosa, Tamaulipas (La Villa de Reinosa generic changed after independence because the word says [built] as the king) after Reinosa, Cantabria, Spain
Madrid, Colima after Madrid, Spain
Matamoros, Tamaulipas after Valle de Matamoros, Extremadura, Spain
Altamira, Tamaulipas after Altamira, Bilbao, Spain
Arandas, Jalisco after Aranda, Aragón, Spain
Arandas, Guanajuato after Aranda, Aragón, Spain
Guadalcázar, San Luis Potosí after Guadalcázar, Córdoba, Spain
Lerma, State of Mexico after Lerma, Castile and León, Spain
Lerma, Campeche after Lerma, Castile and León, Spain
Candelaria, Campeche after Candelaria, Tenerife Canary Islands, Spain
Granada, Yucatán after Granada, Andalusia, Spain
Cárdenas, Tabasco after Cárdenas, La Rioja, Spain

Principal areas of settlement 

The Asturians are a very large community that has a long history in Mexico, dating from colonial times to the present. There are about 42,000 people of Asturian birth in Mexico. The Catalans are also very numerous in Mexico. According to sources from the Catalan community, there are approximately 12,000 Catalan-born around the country.. There are also as many as 8,500 Basques, 6,000 Galicians, and 1,600 Canary Islanders.

The largest population of Spanish descent are located in Mexico Valley, Puebla-Veracruz region, Bajío region, Guadalajara Valley, Altos de Jalisco, Northern region and Riviera Maya, where they make up the largest proportion of the Spanish population. Large populations are found in the states like Mexico City, Mexico State, Veracruz, Puebla, Jalisco, Nuevo León, Aguascalientes, Durango, Guanajuato, Querétaro, and Chihuahua.  Also, Northern Mexico is inhabited by many millions of Spanish descendants.  Some states like Zacatecas, Sinaloa, Baja California, Sonora, San Luis Potosí and Tamaulipas.

Mexico City 

Mexico City has the biggest Spanish population in the country. In this city are all the Spanish institutions as Embassy of Spain, cultural centers as soon as Centro Asturiano, Centro Gallego, Casa de Madrid, Casa de Andalucía, Centro Montañes, Orfeo Catalán de Mexico, Centro Vasco, Centro Canario, Centro Republicano Español, Ateneo Español, Casino Español, Asociación Valenciana, Centro Castellano, and health institutions as the Beneficiencia Española, Hospital Español and Hospital-ito.

Also in Mexico City is home to important Spanish schools and universities such as the Colegio Madrid, Universidad Iberoamericana, Colegio de México, and Universidad Anahuac.

Puebla City 
Puebla City is the other major Spanish population in Mexico. The Parque España, a social community and school founded by Spaniards and Spanish Mexicans descendants, is found in the city.

The Centro Gallego de México makes a Beato Sebastián de Aparicio romería to Puebla City each year, this event is an interesting Galician community with Folk music and Galician dances outside the Old San Francisco convento to Downtown Puebla de Zaragoza, Puebla State.

Demographics 
Spanish descendants make up the largest group of Europeans in Mexico and a majority of Mexicans have some degree of Spanish descent. Most of their ancestors arrived during the colonial period but further hundreds of thousands have since then immigrated, especially during the Spanish Civil War in the 1930s. The Encyclopædia Britannica states those of predominantly European descent make up closer to one-sixth (≈17%) of the Mexican population.

Notable people

Spaniards who settled in Mexico

See also

Immigration to Mexico
Basque Mexicans
Mexico–Spain relations
Mexicans of European descent
Hispanos of New Mexico
Portuguese Mexican
Mestizos in Mexico
White Mexicans

References

Further reading
Altman, Ida. Transatlantic Ties in the Spanish Empire: Brihuega, Spain, and Puebla, Mexico, 1560-1620. Stanford University Press, 2000.
Fagen, Patricia W. Exiles and citizens: Spanish republicans in Mexico. Vol. 29. University of Texas Press, 2014.
Faber, Sebastiaan. Exile and cultural hegemony: Spanish intellectuals in Mexico, 1939-1975. Vanderbilt University Press, 2002.
Kenny, Michael. "Twentieth-century Spanish Expatriates in Mexico: an urban Sub-culture." Anthropological Quarterly 35.4 (1962): 169-180.
Powell, Thomas G. Mexico and the Spanish Civil War. University of New Mexico Press, 1981.
Rickett, Rosy. "Refugees of the Spanish Civil War and those they left behind: personal testimonies of departure, separation and return since 1936." Diss. The University of Manchester (United Kingdom), 2015.
Smith, Lois Elwyn. Mexico and the Spanish republicans. Vol. 4. University of California Press, 1955.

External links
 How the Spanish Civil War Drove My Family to Mexico
 Los que llegaron, Españoles
 Los niños de Morelia
 Romería del Pilar in Parque España, Puebla City.

 
European Mexican
Mexico–Spain relations
Spanish diaspora in Mexico
Ethnic groups in Mexico